Najafgarh Lake, Najafgarh Marsh or Najafgarh Jheel (Jheel in Hindi means a lake), fed  by Sahibi River, used to be a vast lake in the south west of Delhi in India, near the town of Najafgarh from which it takes its name. It was connected to the river Yamuna by a natural shallow nullah or drain called the Najafgarh nullah. However, after the 1960s the Flood Control Department of Delhi kept widening the Najafgarh drain in the pretext of saving Delhi from floods and eventually drained the once huge and ecologically rich Najafgarh lake completely.

Need for recreation of the drained lake
With recent advances in ecological understanding it has become clear that draining of this vast lake affected the entire climate of this important region that is India's capital territory of Delhi and its neighborhood, it also led to the underground water-table going down leading to water scarcity for this densely populated region. However, at the time of the draining of the lake in the 1960s or in the decades that followed the issue of destroying the rich wetland ecosystem and wildlife habitat of the lake, its ecological value and its value as a water reservoir recharging the local water table in the dry months and the effect of draining this vast lake on local climate largely went unnoticed and undiscussed as the general public, the media and news agencies or the related environment departments were largely unaware and oblivious of what was happening and its long-term effects. Even now the fact that a vast lake ever existed here in the region and the current need for resurrecting it remains largely an unknown little discussed issue. The complete draining of the lake caused the great loss of a rich wetland ecosystem and wildlife habitat and led to the water-table in the entire region to go down which has in turn led to the area becoming more and more arid. There have been some plans since to at least resurrect a much smaller lake in the area. Most of the Najafgarh jheel basin lands have increased many folds in their value owing to them coming within Delhi, India's capital territory and are under ownership of farmers who may want to make a fast buck selling them to developers who want to convert the former lake basin into housing complexes as has already been happening with major housing colonies coming up in the region. If Najafgarh drain, which was built to drain the original Najafgarh lake or jheel, ever breaches its wide embankments it will flood these developed lands and housing colonies owing to them spread all over the former low lying jheel or lake basin.

Pre-draining history: A vast lake
It had an extremely rich wetland ecosystem forming a refuge for vast quantities of waterbirds and local wildlife. The lake was one of the last habitats of the famed and endangered Siberian crane which has all but vanished from the Indian subcontinent now. Till before independence many British colonial officers and dignitaries came in large parties for waterfowl hunting every season.

Najafgarh drain or nullah

The Najafgarh drain or Najafgarh nullah (nullah in Hindi means drain)  is just another name for the River Sahibi which continues its flow through Delhi where it is channelized due to flood control purposes, it is a tributary to River Yamuna in which it outfalls here. Within Delhi it is erroneously called "Najafgarh drain" or "Najafgarh nullah"', it gets this name from the once famous and huge Najafgarh Jheel (lake) near the town of Najafgarh in southwest Delhi and within urbanized Delhi it is the Indian Capital's most polluted water body due to direct inflow of untreated sewage from surrounding populated areas. A January 2005 report by the Central Pollution Control Board clubs this drain with 13 other highly polluted wetlands under category ‘‘D ’’ for assessing the water quality of wetlands in wildlife habitats.

Bird Sanctuary and wetland ecosystem

The drain has been much widened over the years to drain all the water which in earlier decades used to collect in the Nagafgarh Jheel basin this was supposedly done to remove the threat of flooding in Delhi and now the drain itself acts as an elongated water body or lake with trees planted on both its embankments with an inspection road running on one embankment. During the winter months it attracts vast quantities of migratory birds and also supports local wildlife yearlong. Due to the rich wildlife observed in and around the less polluted stretch of the drain outside of congested populated areas it has been proposed as a Bird Sanctuary for Delhi.

The wetland ecosystem and wildlife habitat on several kilometers of less polluted Najafgarh drain in rural Delhi before entering the main city including the former Najafgarh lake or Najafgarh jheel area is very important habitat to migratory waterbirds as well as local wildlife and has been earmarked to be declared a bird sanctuary for Delhi. The area came to be recognized as an important wildlife habitat after a local naturalist studying the area during 1986-88 called attention to it recommending it to be conserved as a bird sanctuary after which the Delhi wildlife department posted 16 guards in the area to control illegal bird hunters including diplomats from various international embassies located in Delhi, India's capital. Delhi Administration officials were tasked with declaring about 25km stretch of the drain in rural delhi, including where is passes through the core area of the now drained Najafgarh Lake, "protected" under the "Wildlife Act" after Lt.-Governor of Delhi Mr. H.L. Kapur was invited to the area for touring the site where he also heard accounts of local villagers about the rampant illegal hunting of waterbirds that went on here every year. The existing staff of the Flood Control and Irrigation Department numbering about 40 were also given the additional responsibility of protecting the wildlife on and around the drain.

Famous visitors of the past
In the huge Najafgarh jheel that existed here, a very rich wetland ecosystem flourished with rich local and migratory bird life; and in the surrounding lands there was plenty of local wildlife. Large hunting parties of local and British colonial elites descended on the lake yearly, many local villagers were employed as guides and assisted with the camping duties in the hunting camps. Local villagers still alive till the end of last century remembered many cars of British colonial officers congregating at the edge of the lake for duck shoots. In those decades bygone, along with the rich wildlife inhabiting the region here also lived the now presumably extinct famous pink-headed ducks of which records exist of having been shot here by the hunters and bird-watchers recorded the presence of rare Siberian cranes that no more visit India.

Farmlands in the Najafgarh lake basin area an important habitat
Farmland with very little disturbance acts as an important bird habitat in the Najafgarh lake basin, even fields lying fallow are used by hundreds of congregating demoiselle cranes and common cranes, pairs of sarus cranes can be seen in the adjoining farmland along the Najafgarh drain. Other resident wild bird and animals also inhabit these farmlands including hares, nilgai, wildcat, common fox, jackal, monitor lizards, various varieties of snakes etc. which also come for shelter into the forested embankments of the drain and disperse into the neighbouring farmland for foraging.

Development of major housing colonies in the former Najafgarh lake basin
After the complete draining of the lake in the 1960s the former lake basin was converted into farmland first and by now various large scale housing projects occupy the former lake basin including vikaspuri, Uttam Nagar, pappankalan, dwarka etc.,  the Delhi airport also borders the former lake basin.

Land costs have skyrocketed and builders and developers have converged on this area which falls within Delhi, land use is changing from farming to housing colony urban development. However, in case if the Najafgarh Drain ever breaches its man-made and fortified embankments during the monsoon season, large swaths of these housing colonies could be flooded, causing a major disaster.

See also
 Bhalswa horseshoe lake
 Najafgarh town, Delhi
 Najafgarh drain, Delhi
 Najafgarh drain bird sanctuary, Delhi
 National Zoological Park Delhi
 Okhla Sanctuary, bordering Delhi in adjoining Uttar Pradesh
 Sultanpur National Park, bordering Delhi in adjoining Gurgaon District, Haryana

References

 ‘Reviving old ponds way out of water woes’, 9 August 2003, The Indian Express
 Action plans on polluted areas in Delhi soon, GN BUREAU, NEW DELHI, MARCH 17, 2010, Governance Now

Further reading
 Delhi Master Plan 2021: Planning Zone-L, West Zone –III of Master Plan of Delhi 2021 - Note the Najafgarh Lake Area shown therein.
 DRAFT ZONAL DEVELOPMENT PLAN PLANNING ZONE- 'L', Overview, Map and Villages in L-Zone.
 Flood Problem due to Sahibi River, Department of Irrigation and Flood Control, Government of NCT of Delhi, India.
 WASTEWATER MANAGEMENT IN NAJAFGARH DRAINAGE BASIN – KEY TO WATER QUALITY IMPROVEMENT IN RIVER YAMUNA, by Asit Nema of Foundation for Greentech Environmental Systems1 and Dr. Lalit Agrawal of Tokyo Engineering Consultants, Japan2
 FLOOD CONTROL - The National Capital Territory of Delhi
 ‘Part of Najafgarh drain to be covered’, 12 September 2009, The Hindu
 How Sultanpur happened: Sultanpur and Najafgarh Jheels - by Peter Jackson, 
 ‘Reviving old ponds way out of water woes’, 9 August 2003, The Indian Express
 [Book: A Guide to the Birds of the Delhi Area (1975) by Usha Ganguli, a member of the Delhi Birdwatching Society. She includes sections from "The Imperial Gazetteer of India" annual colonial records of British India from Delhi detailing local wildlife and extent of water accumulation in Najafgarh Jheel basin yearly.]
 [Birdwatching Articles from 1961 to 1975 from wetlands of Najafgarh lake by Usha Ganguli in "Newsletter for Birdwatchers" edited by Zafar Futehally]
 Proposal for ground water recharge in National Capital Region (NCR) by Dr. S. K. Sharma, Ground water expert, 
 , Delhi's Watery Woes by Arun Kumar Singh
 Birds are back at Najafgarh Jheel, 19 08 2010, Delhi Edition, Hindustan Times
 No more water-logging at airport with new drain in place, New Delhi, 17 December 2009, The Hindu
 Walls to be constructed around Najafgarh drain, New Delhi, 29 December 2006, Hindustan Times
 Groundwater to be recharged at Najafgarh, Mungeshwar drains, 10 March 2007, The Indian Express
 Gurgaon polluting Najafgarh drain, draws Minister's ire, by Rajesh Kumar, New Delhi, 27/07/2006, The Pioneer
 Winged visitors are back at Najafgarh Lake, New Delhi,  03/11/2011, Hindustan Times. Also see 
 CHAPTER J.- DESCRIPTIVE· pages from the Gazeteers, Delhi, 1912
 URBAN FLOODING AND ITS MANAGEMENT, 2006. India Disaster Management Congress.IIPA Campus, IP Estate, Near ITO Road, New Delhi. National Institute of Disaster Management, Ministry of Home Affairs, Government of India
 ACTION PLAN, ABATEMENT OF POLLUTION IN CRITICALLY POLLUTED AREA OF NAJAFGARH DRAN BASIN INCLUDING OKHLA, NARAINA, ANAND PARBAT AND WAZIRPUR INDL AREAS, DELHI POLLUTION CONTROL COMMITTEE, 4th Floor, ISBT Building, Kashmere Gate, Delhi-6, March, 2011
 BLUE DELHI DECLARATION, White Paper on: Aiming for Sustainability and Self Sufficiency in Delhi Water Management – Evaluating Delhi's Current Water Assets vis a vis their Utilisation
 URBAN FLOODING DEMOGRAPHY AND URBANIZATION by Shashikant Nishant Sharma sns.sahil[at]gmail[dot]com 11/1/2010, SCHOOL OF PLANNING AND ARCHITECTURE, Delhi
 Biodegradation of wastewater of Najafgarh drain, Delhi using autochthonous microbial consortia : a laboratory study. by Sharma G, Mehra NK, Kumar R. Source Limnology Unit, Department of Zoology, University of Delhi, Delhi-1 10 007, India.
 A search for archived News Articles on Najafgarh Drain on the India Envirinmental Portal website
 City to get its 1st bird sanctuary, 15/02/2005, Asian Age (New Delhi)
 New camp to jazz up tourism in city soon, 19 April 2010, Asian Age (New Delhi)
 Delhiites to cool off with aqua sports, New Delhi, 30 September 2007, Tribune News Service, The Tiribune, Chandigarh
 Proposal for groundwater recharge in National Capital Region - A report by SK Sharma and Green Systems, Submitted by samir Nazareth on 22 April 2011, India waterportal - Safe, sustainable water for all

External links
 Recorded Forests (Notified Forest Areas in Delhi), Forest Department, Government of National Capital Territory of Delhi, India
 Tourism Infrastructure, Tourism department, Government of National Capital Territory of Delhi, India
 Irrigation & Flood Control Department, Government of National Capital Territory of Delhi, India
 Plantation/Greening of Delhi, Department of Environment, Government of NCT of Delhi, India
 facebook Topic: Delhi - Najafgarh Drain Birdwatching Report
 facebook: Checklist of the Birds of the Najafgarh Jheel Region - Including adjoining areas of Dhansa Barrage and the Najafgarh Drain in Delhi, by Sajit P. Mohanan
 A Search for: Najafgarh drain on the Google group "delhibirdpix"
 Discussion: !!!300 SqKm [sic] of Lake near Gurgaon !!! A Total Surprise -   Indian Real Estate Forum
 U-turn: Haryana will identify Najafgarh lake as wetland, TNN, Times of India, 7 January 2017

Lakes of Delhi
Wetlands of India